Biyang County is a county of Zhumadian city in southern Henan province, People's Republic of China. It borders Queshan to the east, Tongbai to the north, Tanghe to the west, Luohe to the north, Sheqi and Nanyang to the northwest. Population was 950,000 in 2002.

Administration
The county has 7 towns, 18 townships and 401 villages.
Towns

Townships

Climate

References

External links
Government website of Biyang(in Simplified Chinese)

County-level divisions of Henan
Zhumadian